Quinton Bohanna (born March 16, 1999) is an American football defensive tackle for the Dallas Cowboys of the National Football League (NFL). He was selected with the 192nd pick of the 2021 NFL Draft. He played college football at Kentucky.

Early years
Bohanna attended Cordova High School. As a junior, he tallied 79 tackles and 12 sacks.

As a senior, he posted 91 tackles (24 tackles for loss) and 19 sacks, while contributing to the team having a 12–2 record and reaching the Tennessee Secondary School Athletic Association 6A semifinals. 

Bohanna was a three-time All-state selection and ranked as a threestar recruit by 247Sports.com coming out of high school. He committed to Kentucky on February 24, 2016.

College career
As a true freshman, he played in 12 out of 13 games, starting the last 5 contests at nose guard. He totaled 14 tackles and one pass breakup.

As a sophomore, he started in 7 out of 12 games. He collected 17 tackles (4 tackles for loss), one sack, one forced fumble and one fumble recovery. He missed the third game against Murray State University game with an injury.

As a junior, he started in all 13 games at nose guard. He registered 18 tackles (3 for loss), one sack and one pass breakup. He had 4 tackles against Mississippi State University.

As a senior, he appeared in 8 games and was a part of a defense that had 5 players selected in the 2021 NFL Draft. He missed 3 contests with a knee injury. He posted 10 tackles (2 for loss), 3 quarterback hits and 2 pass breakups. He had 2 quarterback hits against Mississippi State University.

Professional career

Bohanna was selected by the Dallas Cowboys in the sixth round (192nd overall) of the 2021 NFL Draft. He signed his four-year rookie contract on May 13, 2021.

Personal life
His uncle Brian Ingram, played as a linebacker in the NFL.
His father is a rapper from Memphis,Tennessee, known as Gangsta Blac, formerly of Three 6 Mafia.

References

External links
Kentucky Wildcats bio

1999 births
Living people
People from Cordova, Tennessee
Players of American football from Tennessee
American football defensive tackles
Kentucky Wildcats football players
Dallas Cowboys players